Household income is a measure of the combined incomes of all people sharing a particular household or place of residence. It includes every form of income, e.g., salaries and wages, retirement income, near cash government transfers like food stamps, and investment gains.

Average household incomes need not map directly to measures of an individual's earnings such as per capita income as numbers of people sharing households and numbers of income earners per household can vary significantly between regions and over time.

Average household income can be used as an indicator for the monetary well-being of a country's citizens. Mean or median net household income, after taxes and mandatory contributions, are taken as indicators of standard of living, because they include only disposable income and acknowledge people sharing accommodation benefit from pooling at least some of their living costs.

Median income is the amount that divides the income distribution into two equal groups, half having income above that amount, and half having income below that amount. Mean income (average) is the amount obtained by dividing the total aggregate income of a group by the number of units in that group.

Disposable income per capita (OECD)

Mean 
The list below represents a national accounts derived indicator for a country or territory's gross household disposable income per capita (including social transfers in kind). According to the OECD, 'household disposable income is income available to households such as wages and salaries, income from self-employment and unincorporated enterprises, income from pensions and other social benefits, and income from financial investments (less any payments of tax, social insurance contributions and interest on financial liabilities). 'Gross’ means that depreciation costs are not subtracted.' This indicator also takes account of social transfers in kind 'such as health or education provided for free or at reduced prices by governments and not-for-profit organisations.' The data shown below is published by the OECD and is presented in purchasing power parity (PPP) in order to adjust for price differences between countries.

*Figures have been rounded to the nearest hundred; if data is unavailable for 2021, figures for 2020 or 2019 are shown.

Median equivalent adult income 
The following table represents data from the OECD's "median disposable income per person" metric; disposable income deducts from gross income taxes on income and wealth as well as contributions paid by households to public social security schemes. The figures are equivalised by dividing income by the square root of household size. As the OECD displays median disposable incomes in each country's respective currency, they have been converted (using PPP conversion factors for private consumption from the same source) in order to account for each country's cost of living in the year that the disposable median income was recorded. Data are in United States dollars at current prices and current purchasing power parity for private consumption for the reference year.

Median household net income (Eurostat)
The following table shows data from Eurostat on household median equivalised net income adjusted for differences in purchasing power between countries. According to Eurostat, 'the total disposable income of a household is calculated by adding together the personal income received by all household members plus income received at household level...Disposable household income includes: All income from work (employee wages and self-employment earnings), private income from investment and property, transfers between households, all social transfers received in cash including old-age pensions.' This indicator does not include non-monetary income components such as the value of goods produced for own consumption, social transfers in kind and non-cash employee income (except company cars). Furthermore, to take account of differences in household sizes, disposable income per household is equivalised. 

* Data for Norway, Slovakia and Turkey is from 2020. The most recent data for Iceland and UK is from 2018.

See also
 Income distribution
 List of countries by wealth per adult

References

External links

Household income lists
Income by country
Macroeconomic indicators